Events from the year 1921 in Italy.

Kingdom of Italy
Monarch – Victor Emmanuel III (1900–1946)
Prime Minister – 
 Giovanni Giolitti (1920–1921)
 Ivanoe Bonomi (1921–1922)
Population – 39,943,528

Events

In 1921 Fascist and anti-Fascist violence in Italy grew with Italian army officers beginning to assist the Fascists with their violence against communists and socialists. With the Fascist movement growing, anti-fascists of various political allegiances combined into the Arditi del Popolo (People's Militia).

January
 January 21 – The Communist Party of Italy is founded in Livorno, following a split in the Italian Socialist Party at their 17th congress.

February
 February 28 – A fascist squad devastates the Camera del lavoro in Triest. Shortly afterwards the Milanese branch of the socialist newspaper Avanti! is burned down.

April
 April 26 – A fascist squad devastates the Camera del lavoro in Turin.

May
 May 15 – General election. The Liberal governing coalition of Giovanni Giolitti, strengthened by the joining of Fascist candidates in the National Bloc (35 of whom were elected deputies), came short of a majority (275 seats). The Italian Socialist Party lost many votes and seats (from 156 to 122), weakened by the split of the Communist Party of Italy (who won 16), while the Italian People's Party was steady around 20%, gaining some seats (from 100 to 107). Benito Mussolini is elected for the first time.

June
 June 27 – Prime minister Giolitti resigns, due to the small but insufficient majority obtained at the confidence vote of June 26.

July
 July 4 – A new conservative government is formed by Ivanoe Bonomi.
 July 6 – An anti-fascist militia, the Arditi del Popolo, is founded on the initiative of anarchist and republican groups, and rapidly spreads in Liguria, Emilia, Tuscany, Umbria and Lazio. The Arditi are not supported by the socialist parties (neither by the Italian Socialist Party, PSI, nor by the Communist Party of Italy, PCI).
 July 21 – In Sarzana Fascist squads occupy the station and are preparing to enter the city to impose the release of a dozen arrested fascists, but are attacked by the Carabinieri and the population resulting in eighteen dead and about thirty injured.

August
 August 2 –  Pact of Pacification between Benito Mussolini and his Fasci Italiani di Combattimento, and the Italian Socialist Party (PSI) and the General Confederation of Labor (CGL). The agreement was short-lived since many of the fascist squadristi leaders denounced the pacification pact with the socialists, along with Mussolini’s leadership, arguing that the Duce “had not created the movement” and that they could “get along without him.”
 August 18 –  In Il Popolo d'Italia Mussolini announces his resignation from the executive board of the Fascists because of the resistance to the pacification pact.
 August 26 –  The Fascist National Council rejects Mussolini's resignation from the executive board. With regard to the pacification pact, the council does not impose a precise line and leaves the issue to be resolved autonomously by individual squads.

November
 November 9 – The National Fascist Party (PNF) is founded during the Third Fascist Congress in Rome on November 7–10, 1921.

December
 December 28 – The Banca Italiana di Sconto goes bust. The bank is granted a moratorium of one year to resolve its financial problems.

Births
 February 3 – Antonio Natali, Italian politician (d. 1991)
 February 22 – Giulietta Masina, Italian actress (d. 1994)
 March 12 – Gianni Agnelli, Italian entrepreneur and principal shareholder of Fiat (d. 2003)
 April 8 – Franco Corelli, Italian opera singer (d. 2003)
 April 17 – Sergio Sollima, Italian director (d. 2015)
 May 12 – Giovanni Benelli, Italian Cardinal who served as the Archbishop of Florence (d. 1982)
 May 31 – Alida Valli, Italian actress who appeared in more than 100 films (d. 2006)
 July 5 – Vito Ortelli, Italian racing cyclist (d. 2017)
 July 24 - Giuseppe Di Stefano, Italian operatic tenor (d. 2008)
 August 15 – Vittorio Caprioli, Italian actor, director and screenwriter (d. 1989)
 August 23 – Franco Ossola, Italian footballer (d. 1949)
 August 25 – Cesare Terranova, Italian judge and politician from Sicily killed by the Mafia (d. 1979)
 September 14 – Dario Vittori, Italian-born Argentine actor (d. 2001)
 October 4 - Gianni Poggi, operatic tenor (d. 1989)
 November 23 – Fred Buscaglione, Italian singer and actor (d. 1960)
 December 18 – Renato Baldini, Italian actor (d. 1995)

Deaths
 February 2 – Andrea Carlo Ferrari, Italian cardinal who served as the Archbishop of Milan (b. 1850)
 March 16 – Olinto De Pretto, Italian industrialist and geologist (b. 1857)
 August 2 – Enrico Caruso, Italian operatic tenor (b. 1873)

References 

 Berghaus, Günter (1996). Futurism and Politics: Between Anarchist Rebellion and Fascist Reaction, 1909-1944, Providence (RI): Berghahn Books, 
 Bosworth, R. J. B. (2007). Mussolini's Italy: Life Under the Fascist Dictatorship, 1915-1945, London: Penguin Books, 
 Delzell, Charles F. (ed.) (1971). Mediterranean Fascism 1919-1945, New York (NY), Walker and Company, 
 Payne, Stanley G. (1996). A History of Fascism, 1914-1945, Madison: University of Wisconsin Press, 
 Smith, Denis Mack (1997). Modern Italy: A Political History, Ann Arbor: The University of Michigan Press, 

 
1920s in Italy
Years of the 20th century in Italy